Mike McShaffry , a.k.a. "Mr. Mike," is a video game programmer, entrepreneur and author.  He is known as the director of Ultima VIII: Pagan. He graduated from the University of Houston and began his video game industry career working for Origin Systems in 1990. He worked on titles such as Martian Dreams, Ultima VII: The Black Gate, Ultima VIII: Pagan, Ultima IX: Ascension and Ultima Online. In 1997 he formed his own company Tornado Alley. After that, he worked at Glass Eye Games for a while on Casino games, which were notable for being the first games he worked  on that his mom enjoyed playing.

Mike McShaffrey got his start as a video game programmer when he saw the new Austin, Texas address of Origin Systems on the back of the Ultima VI box, and sent them his resume. The first game he worked on was Ultima: Worlds of Adventure 2 - Martian Dreams. In addition to developing and managing many games, Mike did the voice acting for Nicola Tesla in Martian Dreams, and a character named Gordo in Ultima VII.

Since 2003, his book, Game Coding Complete, a comprehensive hands-on guide to developing commercial quality games has been updated and reprinted four times, expanding with each iteration.

After spending seven years at ArtCraft working on CrowFall, as of 2020, he now works as a Cloud Architect at Wave on the servers for Wave's live, virtual concerts.

Charity Work
Big Brothers, Big Sisters of Central Texas - Mike benefitted as a "Little" in 1979, and reengaged with the Austin chapter of the group in 2000 as a fundraiser, recruiting teams for an annual event called Bowl for Kids. “No matter how you choose to use your time,” Mike is quoted as saying, “try allocating a little bit to making the world a better place than you found it.”

Game Contributions
(List from Moby Games developer sheet)
 Ultima: Worlds of Adventure 2 - Martian Dreams (1991) - Programmer
 Ultima VII: The Black Gate (1992) - Programmer
 Ultima VII: Part Two - The Silver Seed (1993) - Programmer
 Ultima VII: Part Two - Serpent Isle (1993) - Programmer
 Pagan: Ultima VIII (1994) - Programmer, Design team, Director
 Ultima Online (1997) - Programmer
 Bicycle Casino Games (2001) - Technology Director
 Thief: Deadly Shadows (2004) - Programmer
 Mushroom Men: The Spore Wars (2008) - Producer
 Ghostbusters: The Video Game (2009) - Executive Producer
 Food Network: Cook or Be Cooked! (2009) - Executive Producer
 Age of Booty: Tactics (2014) - Programmer

Bibliography
  (600 pages)
  (850 pages)
  (908 pages)
  (960 pages) co-authored with David "Rez" Graham

References

External links
 Mike McShaffry profile from MobyGames
 Mike McShaffry's website
 Interview with Mike McShaffry 2014
 Mike McShaffry's Amazon Author page

Living people
Origin Systems people
University of Houston alumni
Video game directors
Video game producers
Video game programmers
1966 births